Imoru is a Ghanaian masculine given name. Notable people with the name include:

Imoru Ayarna ( 1917–2015), Ghanaian businessman and politician
Imoru Egala (1914–1981), foreign minister of Ghana
Imoru Salifu, Ghanaian politician

African masculine given names